Lanthanum carbide (LaC2) is a chemical compound.  It is being studied in relation to the manufacture of certain types of superconductors and nanotubes.

Preparation 
LaC2 can be prepared by reacting lanthanum oxide, La2O3, with carbon in an electric furnace, or by melting pellets of the elements in an arc furnace.

Properties 
LaC2 reacts with water to form acetylene, C2H2 and a mixture of complex hydrocarbons.
LaC2 is a metallic conductor, in contrast to CaC2 which is an insulator.
The crystal structure of LaC2 shows that it contains C2 units with a C-C bond length of 130.3 pm, which is longer than the C-C bond length in calcium carbide, 119.2 pm, which is close to that of ethyne. The structure of LaC2 can be described as La3+C22−(e-) where the electron enters the conduction band and antibonding orbitals on the C2 anion, increasing the bond length. This is analogous to the bonding present in the nitridoborate, CaNiBN.

Lanthanum carbide in carbon nano structures 
A method for making macroscopic quantities of C60 and the confirmation of the hollow, cagelike structures was published in 1990 by Kratschmer and co-workers. This was followed by the publication of methods for higher fullerenes (C70 and higher). In 1993, scientists discovered how to make a compound which is not as susceptible to moisture and air. They made containers to hold buckminsterfullerenes, or buckyballs; therefore they nicknamed the containers ‘buckyjars’.  A few US patents were issued to universities in the mid-1990s; experiments with manufacturing techniques have continued at universities around the globe, including India, Japan, and Sweden.

Lanthanum atoms caged in fullerenes
In La@C72, the lanthanum appears to stabilize the C72 carbon cage.  A 1998 study by Stevenson et al. verified the presence of La@C72 as well as La2@C72, but empty-cage C72 was absent, based on laser desorption mass spectrometry and UV−vis spectroscopy.  A 2008 study by Lu et al. showed that La2C72 do not adhere to the isolated pentagon rule (IPR), but has two pairs of fused pentagons at each pole of the cage and that the two La atoms reside close to the two fused-pentagon pairs. This result lends additional support to the idea that the carbon cage is stabilized by the La atoms.

In addition to the properties included in the table at right, the magnetic properties of bulk amounts of La@C82 (isolated from various hollow fullerenes) have been tested. Magnetization data for an isolated La@C82 isomer were obtained using a SQUID magnetometer at temperatures ranging from 3 to 300 K. For La@C82 the inverse susceptibility as a function of temperature was observed to follow a Curie-Weiss law. The effective magnetic moment per La@C82 was found to be 0.38μB.

Lanthanum carbide has also shown superconductive properties when converted into a layered lanthanum carbide halide La2C2X2 (X=Br,I). Investigations using high-resolution neutron powder diffraction measurements from room temperature to 1.5 Kelvin showed that it has superconductive properties at about 7.03 Kelvin for X=Br and at about 1.7 Kelvin for X=I, respectively.

References

External links
MIT Open Courseware 3.091 – Introduction to Solid State Chemistry
2001 US Patent – Carbide nanomaterials.
1997 US Patent – Storage of hydrogen in layered nanostructures.
1996 US Patent – Metal, alloy, or metal carbide nanoparticles and a process for forming same.
1995 US Patent – Magnetic metal or metal carbide nanoparticles and a process for forming same.

Carbides
Lanthanum compounds
Acetylides
Electrides